Kamešnica may refer to:

 Kamešnica (mountain), on the border of Bosnia and Croatia
 Kamešnica (river), a right tributary of Glogovnica in central Croatia
 Kamešnica, Koprivnica-Križevci County, a village near Kalnik, Croatia
 Kamešnica (Sjenica), a village in Serbia